Anđela Tošković (born 19 August 2004) is a Montenegrin footballer who plays as a midfielder for 1. ŽFL club ŽFK Budućnost Podgorica and the Montenegro women's national team.

International goals

References

2004 births
Living people
Women's association football midfielders
Montenegrin women's footballers
Montenegro women's international footballers
ŽFK Budućnost Podgorica players